Suhaagan is a 1986 Indian Hindi-language drama film, produced by M. Arjuna Raju under the Roja Enterprises banner and directed by K. Raghavendra Rao. It stars Jeetendra, Sridevi, Padmini Kolhapure  and music composed by Bappi Lahari. The film is a remake of the Tamil film Enkeyo Ketta Kural (1982).

Plot
Ram Babu was a simple tiller of the soil, and he used to look after the agricultural lands of this neighbour Jagat Prasad. Jagat Prasad has two daughters, Janki and Jyoti. Janki is a well known punk while Jyoti is just a  plain and simple girl. Jyoti likes Ram Babu, but it is Janki who is married to Ram Babu. Ram Babu and Janki became the parents of baby girl, but their way of thinking is like two sides of the same coin, and to widen it more is a young man Murali. Murali was Jagat Prasad's friend's grandson, with his gift of talks, his bright outlook, he kindles a new light in the dull life of Janki. So far so, that Janki leaves her child and husband and elopes with Murali. On the insistence of Jagat Prasad, Ram marries Jyoti. Masterji comes to meet Janaki and Murali and tells them that what they did was very wrong. Janaki feels guilty and Murli understands that Janaki doesn't want to live with him anymore. Murli arranges a house on the outskirts of Janaki's village where he ask her to go and stay. The same night Murali commits suicide. Janaki is surprised to see him dead however leaves for her village. Everyone berates her. Years pass and Janakis daughter Meena starts going to school. Janaki meets her daughter and every evening takes her to her house to play. Jyoti learns of this and scolds Janaki and Meena. In anger she burns Meena's arm and when Ram scolds her for that she feels guilty and burns her own as well. Janaki falls sick and refuses to take medicines. Her mother visits her and she ask for forgiveness. She ask her mother to ask Ram to meet her once before she dies. Ram agrees and goes to meet Janaki. Janaki cries for forgiveness and Ram forgives her. He also promises to perform her last rites as her husband once she dies. As soon as Ram leaves Janaki touches his slippers that he left behind and dies. As promised and despite objection from Jagat Prasad and threat of being ostracized from the village Ram and Jyoti perform Janaki's last rites.

Cast
Jeetendra as Ram
Sridevi as Janki
Padmini Kolhapure as Jyoti
Raj Babbar as Murli
Pran as Jagat Prasad
Tanuja as Shanta
Kader Khan as Masterji
Shakti Kapoor as Leela Krishna
Aruna Irani as Radha
Chandrashekhar as Murli's grandfather
Asrani

Soundtrack
The music for the film was composed by Bappi Lahiri and written by Indeevar.

References

External links
 

1986 films
1980s Hindi-language films
Films directed by K. Raghavendra Rao
Films scored by Bappi Lahiri
Hindi remakes of Tamil films
1986 drama films
Indian drama films
Hindi-language drama films